David Frank Holland (born 1973) is an American professor and historian. He is currently the John A. Bartlett Professor of New England Church History at Harvard Divinity School and the director of graduate studies in religion at Harvard University. Holland was previously an associate professor of history at University of Nevada, Las Vegas.

Biography
Holland graduated summa cum laude with a bachelor's degree in history from Brigham Young University (BYU) and subsequently received a MA and Ph.D. in history from Stanford University. While he was a graduate student Holland took a summer seminar in Mormon History at BYU with Richard Bushman.  He has held fellowships from the Mellon Foundation, the Whiting Foundation, and Yale's Center for Religion and American Life.

Holland's noted articles include "From Anne Hutchinson to Horace Bushnell: A New Take on the New England Sequence" (The New England Quarterly, 2005), and " 'A Mixed Construction of Subversion and Conversion': The Complicated Lives and Times of Religious Women" (Gender and History, 2010).

In 2011, Holland was named the Nevada professor of the year by the Carnegie Foundation for the Advancement of Teaching.

Personal life
Holland is a member of the Church of Jesus Christ of Latter-day Saints and a son of Jeffrey R. Holland and Patricia T. Holland.  He served as a missionary for the Church in Czechoslovakia and was a bishop in Nevada. Since August 2020, he has been serving as president of the church's Worcester Massachusetts Stake.

Published works

References

External links
Harvard University Profile of David F. Holland
Harvard Divinity School announcement of Holland's appointment
Review of Holland's Sacred Borders

American leaders of the Church of Jesus Christ of Latter-day Saints
21st-century American historians
21st-century American male writers
Harvard Divinity School faculty
Harvard Extension School faculty
Brigham Young University alumni
Stanford University alumni
University of Nevada, Las Vegas faculty
Living people
American Mormon missionaries in Czechoslovakia
20th-century Mormon missionaries
1973 births
Latter Day Saints from Nevada
Latter Day Saints from New Hampshire
American male non-fiction writers